The following army units were involved in the Battle of White Sulphur Springs on August 26 and 27, 1863, in the American Civil War. Although the battle took place near White Sulphur Springs, West Virginia, it has also been called the Battle of Rocky Gap, the Battle of Dry Creek, the Battle of Howard's Creek, and the Battle of the Lawbooks. A Confederate Army force led by Colonel George S. Patton Sr. successfully repelled a Union Army brigade led by Brigadier General William W. Averell.

The Union Army units, and their commanders, are listed first. The Confederate Army units, and their commanders, follow. Most of the men on both sides were from West Virginia and Virginia units, and some of the Confederates were from Greenbrier County, where the battle took place.

Abbreviations used

Military rank
 BG = Brigadier General
 Col = Colonel
 Ltc = Lieutenant Colonel
 Maj = Major
 Cpt = Captain
 Lt = 1st Lieutenant

Other
 w  = wounded
 k  = killed

Middle Military District, VIII Corps

Fourth Separate Brigade
BG William W. Averell
Cpt Paul von Köenig, Aide-de-camp, detached from 68th New York Infantry Regiment (k)
Lt William H. Rumsey, Aide-de-camp
Lt John R. Meigs, Engineer Officer

Approximately 1,300 men in brigade at the battle.

Other Union forces not at White Sulphur Springs
This portion of Averell's 4th Separate Brigade remained near Huntersville after the town was captured by Averell.

Union images
{| style="align:left; margin-left:1em"
!bgcolor="#99ccff"|Principal Union commanders
|-
|

Confederate Department of Western Virginia
Col George S. Patton Sr., acting commander in absence of BG John Echols
 Maj W. B. Myers, assistant adjutant-general
 Cpt R. L. Poor, engineer corps
 Lt Noyes Rand, acting assistant adjutant-general
 Lt E. C. Gordon, ordnance officer
 Lt James F. Patton, acting brigade inspector
 Lt Henry C. Caldwell, volunteer aide

Approximately 2,300 men at the battle.

Additional Confederate forces not in the battle
Jackson's Brigade was not directly involved in the Battle of White Sulphur Springs. The brigade was involved in the pursuit of Averell when Averell was moving south. A week prior to the Battle of White Sulphur Springs, Averell captured Jackson's Camp Northwest near Huntersville, West Virginia, and Jackson fled the area. Averell destroyed the camp's commissary, blacksmith shops, and equipment, while keeping items such as canteens, stretchers, and hospital supplies. After the Battle of White Sulphur Springs, Jackson's pursuit of Averell was described as "halfhearted and not well managed".

Confederate images
{| style="align:left; margin-left:1em"
!bgcolor="#99ccff"|Principal Confederate commanders
|-
|

Notes

Footnotes

Citations

References

American Civil War orders of battle